Fornovo San Giovanni is a comune (municipality) in the Province of Bergamo in the Italian region of Lombardy, located in the Gera d'Adda, about  east of Milan and about  south of Bergamo.

Fornovo San Giovanni borders the following municipalities: Bariano, Caravaggio, Fara Olivana con Sola, Mozzanica, Romano di Lombardia.

References